

Countess of Longueville

House of Orléans-Longueville, 1443–1505

Duchess of Longueville

House of Orléans-Longueville, 1505–1694

See also 
List of consorts of Neuchâtel

 
Longueville
Longueville
Dukes of Longueville
Longueville